Architectus  is a architectural firm based in Australia and New Zealand. The firm has over 300 staff with offices in Adelaide, Auckland, Brisbane, Christchurch, Melbourne, Sydney, Perth and Wellington.

Architectus’ portfolio includes commercial, education, hospitality, retail, transport, industrial, interiors, public buildings, residential, urban design and planning projects.

Major architectural works
Architectus has designed some of Australasia's landmark buildings including the following major architectural projects:

Data

See also

Architecture of Australia
Architecture of New Zealand

References

External links

Architecture firms of Australia
Architecture firms based in Victoria (Australia)
1990s establishments in Australia
Companies established in the 1990s